Royal Bellfounders Petit & Fritsen, located in Aarle-Rixtel, the Netherlands, is a former foundry, one of the oldest family-owned businesses in the Netherlands, with the foundry dating back to 1660.

Petit & Fritsen was a foundry that cast bells from tintinnabulous bell metal. The bells could be mounted as individual striking instruments, as for example in a clock tower; could be combined into striking chimes; or could be mounted in complex carillons.

In 2014 Royal Eijsbouts, in Asten, acquired bell foundry Petit & Fritsen, their last Dutch competitor. Foundry activities in Aarle-Rixtel were terminated and re-allocated to Asten.

See also 
 Rees Memorial Carillon
 St. Joseph's Church, Semarang
 Freedom Bell, American Legion
 List of oldest companies

References

External links 

1660 establishments in the Dutch Republic
Bell foundries
Carillon makers
Musical instrument manufacturing companies of the Netherlands